Mitchell Parish (born Michael Hyman Pashelinsky; July 10, 1900 – March 31, 1993) was an American lyricist, notably as a writer of songs for stage and screen.

Biography
Parish was born to a Jewish family in Lithuania, Russian Empire in July 1900 His family emigrated to the United States, arriving on February 3, 1901, aboard the  when he was less than a year old. They settled first in Louisiana where his paternal grandmother had relatives, but later moved to New York City, where he grew up on the Lower East Side of Manhattan and received his education in the public schools. 

He attended Columbia University and N.Y.U. and was a member of Phi Beta Kappa. He eventually abandoned the notion of practicing law to become a songwriter. He served his apprenticeship as a writer of special material for vaudeville acts, and later established himself as a writer of songs for stage, screen and numerous musical revues. By the late 1920s, Parish was a well-regarded Tin Pan Alley lyricist in New York City.

Parish's grandnephew, Steve Parish, was a roadie for the band Grateful Dead. He described Mitchell Parish's meeting with Jerry Garcia in his autobiography, Home Before Day Light.

Career

His first steady employer was the music publisher Jack Mills, brother of Irving Mills, who signed him for $12 a week to write comedy lyrics for vaudeville acts and to be a song-plugger. His first hit, "Carolina Rolling Stone," was recorded by the musical comedy team Van and Schenck for Columbia Records in 1922. Parish tended to write his lyrics to completed melodies, hits that originated in other languages, or adaptations of classical music.

Hoagy Carmichael, Duke Ellington, Peter De Rose, Leroy Anderson, Glenn Miller, Sammy Fain, and Benny Goodman were among the composers .  As one of the first inductees into the Songwriters Hall of Fame, the romantic quality of many of his lyrics such as "Stardust", "Stairway to the Stars", "Deep Purple", and "Moonlight Serenade" contributed to his being called by other songwriters "the poet laureate of the profession." In an interview in 1987,  Parish claimed to have written the lyrics to the Duke Ellington standard "Mood Indigo," though they were credited to Irving Mills. He remained "somewhat rueful, though no longer bitter" about it.

His best-known works include the lyrics to songs such as "Stardust," "Sweet Lorraine," "Deep Purple," "Stars Fell on Alabama," "Sophisticated Lady," the translation to English lyrics of "Volare" and "Blue Skirt Waltz," "Moonlight Serenade," "Mr. Ghost Goes to Town," "Sleigh Ride," "One Morning in May," and "Louisiana Fairy Tale," which was the first theme song used in the PBS Production of This Old House.

Besides providing the lyrics to Hoagy Carmichael's "Stardust," the two collaborated on standards such as "Riverboat Shuffle" and "One Morning in May."

In 1949, Parish added lyrics to bandleader Al Goodman's tune "The Allen Stroll," which was played as radio comedian Fred Allen took a stroll down "Allen's Alley," a featured segment of Allen's weekly show. The new song, "Carousel of Love," premiered on The Fred Allen Show on April 4, 1949. It was sung by the DeMarco Sisters and played by Al Goodman and his Orchestra.

In 1950, he wrote lyrics to Leroy Anderson's "The Syncopated Clock."

In 1951, he wrote the English lyrics of the French song "Maître Pierre" which was written in 1948 by Henri Betti (music) and Jacques Plante (lyrics). The title song became "The Windmill Song" and the song was recorded by The Andrews Sisters with Gordon Jenkins and his Orchestra.

In 1972, he was inducted into the Songwriters Hall of Fame. He is the recipient of their Johnny Mercer Award.

The Evolution of "Stardust"

"Stardust" was conceived by Hoagy Carmichael in 1927 as a jazz instrumental, influenced by Bix Beiderbecke.  Parish wrote the lyrics in 1929, and the song became a hit the following year in a recording by Isham Jones, who led one of the most popular orchestras of the pre-swing era. "Stardust" was resurrected during the swing era, when Benny Goodman and Tommy Dorsey both had hit versions. In 1940, Artie Shaw recorded "Stardust" and Tommy Dorsey recorded a second version featuring Frank Sinatra and the Pied Pipers.

The song went on to have three other commercially significant lives, each in a different style. In 1957, it was a hit for Billy Ward and the Dominoes and the same year was the centerpiece of one of Nat King Cole's most successful albums, "Love Is the Thing."  In 1978, Willie Nelson revived "Stardust" as a country ballad, as the title track to his album of the same title "Stardust", that sold three million copies. "Stardust" also became the title of a revue of Parish's lyrics. It was mounted off-Broadway, then moved briefly to Broadway the following year, where it was the last production in the Biltmore Theater. It ran for 101 performances and was revived in 1999.

Song Lyrics (selected)

Work on Broadway
Continental Varieties (1935) - revue - featured lyricist
Lew Leslie's Blackbirds of 1939 (1939) - revue - performer
Earl Carroll's Vanities of 1940 (1940) - revue - featured lyricist
Bubbling Brown Sugar (1976) - revue - featured lyricist
Sophisticated Ladies (1981) - featured lyricist for "Sophisticated Lady"
Stardust (1987) - revue - lyricist

Death
Parish died in 1993 in Manhattan, New York at the age of 92. He was buried in Beth David Cemetery in Elmont, New York.

References
 Hill, Tony L. "Mitchell Parish, 1900-1993," in Dictionary of Literary Biography 265.  Detroit: Gale Research, 2002.

Footnotes

External links
Entry at Internet Broadway Database
 Mitchell Parish recordings at the Discography of American Historical Recordings.
 
 

1900 births
1993 deaths
American lyricists
American musical theatre lyricists
American people of Lithuanian-Jewish descent
Emigrants from the Russian Empire to the United States
Jewish American songwriters
Lithuanian Jews
Musicians from Shreveport, Louisiana
20th-century American musicians
Writers from Shreveport, Louisiana
Songwriters from Louisiana
Burials at Beth David Cemetery
20th-century American Jews